The Perils of Pauline is a 1914 American melodrama film serial produced by William Randolph Hearst and released by the Eclectic film company, shown in bi-weekly installments, featuring Pearl White as the title character, an ambitious young heiress with an independent nature (in the time before women could vote in the United States) and a desire for adventure. The premise of the story was that Pauline's wealthy guardian Sanford Marvin, upon his death, has left her inheritance in the care of his secretary, Raymond Owen, until the time of her marriage. Pauline wants to wait a while before marrying, as her dream is to go out and have adventures then write about them afterward. Owen, hoping to ultimately keep the money for himself, tries to turn Pauline's various adventures against her and have her "disappear" to his own advantage.

Despite popular associations, Pauline was never tied to a railroad track in the series, an image that was added to popular mythology by scenes in stage melodramas of the 1800s, in serials featuring the resourceful "railroad girl" Helen Holmes in her long-running series The Hazards of Helen, and in other railroad-themed Holmes cliffhangers such as The Girl and the Game. The images of Holmes' railroad adventures were blended in the public mind with Pearl White's cliffhanging adventures, probably because White became the bigger celebrity and was so better-remembered.

The serial had 20 episodes, the first being three reels (30 minutes), and the rest two reels (20 minutes) each. After the original run, it was reshown in theaters a number of times, sometimes in re-edited versions, through the 1920s. Today, The Perils of Pauline is known to exist only in a condensed, reformatted 9-chapter version (approximately 214 minutes), released in Europe in 1916 by Pathé Freres.

In 2008, The Perils of Pauline was selected by the Library of Congress for the United States National Film Registry, as being "culturally, historically, or aesthetically significant".

Plot
Before Pauline (Pearl White) will agree to marry Harry (Crane Wilbur), who proposes marriage to her on the tennis court, she says that she wishes to be allowed to embark upon activities of her choice for a year and then write about them afterward. She proceeds then to plan to ride in a balloon, fly an airplane, drive a racing car, ride in a horse race, go on a treasure hunt, act in a motion picture, and tour a submarine, among other things, and frequently ends up in trouble after being assaulted by henchmen of Raymond Owen (Paul Panzer), her adoptive father's scheming secretary, who wants to dispose of Pauline and gain her inheritance for himself. Owen hires the disreputable Hicks (Francis Carlyle) who owes Owen money, and later Gypsy king called Balthazar to sabotage Pauline's plans, or kidnap or murder her and often Harry ends up coming to her rescue when she is trapped on a cliff or tied up in a house set afire, but as the series goes on she is also shown to be able to extricate herself from various predicaments as well. Finally, after she ends up trapped on an abandoned ship being used for target practice by the Navy and is genuinely terrified by the experience, Pauline decides she has had enough of adventuring and agrees to marry Harry, Owen is drowned by a sailor he has refused to allow to blackmail him, and all is well.

Cast
 Pearl White as Pauline Marvin
 Crane Wilbur as Harry Marvin
 Paul Panzer as Raymond Owen (Called Koerner in the European release)
 Edward José as Sanford Marvin
 Francis Carlyle as Owen's Henchman, Montgomery Hicks
 Clifford Bruce as Gypsy Leader Balthazar
 Donald MacKenzie as Blinky Bill
 Jack Standing as Lieutenant Summers
 Eleanor Woodruff as Lucille

Chapter titles 
The original serial episodes had no titles, only episode numbers. Titles for episodes have been applied to them from the condensed Pathé release of the serial or sometimes as derived from novelizations of the serial.

The original 20 episodes contained the following story elements:

 MUMMY CASE/WILL Pauline's ambition to have adventures and write about them before marrying, Egyptian mummy speaks to Mr. Marvin, Death of Marvin and Owen's plot to kill Pauline and gain her inheritance
 AIRFIELD Owen tampers with an airplane he thinks Pauline will fly and causes it to crash
 OLD SAILOR'S STORY Blinky Bill the sailor tells a story of mutiny and treasure
 TREASURE ISLAND Expedition to an island to recover lost treasure; bomb on board ship
 RECEPTION/ABDUCTION BY CHINESE Pearl charms Signor Baskinelli, seized by Chinamen, imprisoned in a Joss House
 BALLOON/CLIFF Owen and Hicks conspire to set Pauline aloft in a balloon, rescue from cliff's edge
 HOUSE FIRE/WESTERN ACTION Pauline trapped in abandoned house set afire, Harry rescues her, she travels West and is kidnapped
 INDIANS Pauline is believed to be a goddess and tested by an Indian tribe
 DEVIL'S ISLAND Pauline acts in a movie for director Louis Gasnier
 SMUGGLERS Lighthouse, rocket gun
 SOPHIE MACALLEN'S WEDDING Escaped lions, auto crash
 CAPTURED BY GYPSIES Pauline abducted, Harry fights Balthazar
 SERPENT IN THE GARDEN Snake in basket, Steeplechase, house party in Aedirondacks, cliff's edge
 TRAPPED IN RUINED MILL Trapped by rising water, escape on high telegraph wire
 DUEL/AUTO RACE Ferrari challenges Harry to duel, Auto race, car sabotaged by Owen
 THE GERM "Drowning disease" caused by germ
 DOG AND COUNTERFEITERS Pauline's dog abducted by counterfeiters
 SUBMARINE Spy sabotages submarine, Pauline is on board
 FAKE PUBLISHER Hotel trap, circus car, escaped ape
 FLOATING COFFIN: Pauline takes motorboat to abandoned ship used for target practice by Navy men

Titles of the Pathé 9-episode condensed and re-edited re-release stories which have been used subsequently were:

1 - "Par le Vertige et Par le Feu" (Trial by Fire (US),Vertigo and Fire, or From Cloud to Cliff)
2 - "La Deesse du Far-West" (Goddess of the Far West)
3 - "La Tresor du Pirate" (The Pirate Treasure)
4 - "Le Virage Mortel" (The Deadly Turning (US),The Deadly Curve)
5 - "La Fil Aerien" (A Watery Doom (US), The Aerial Wire)
6 - "L'Aile Brisee" (The Shattered Plane (US), The Broken Wing)
7 - "La Plongee Tragique" (The Tragic Plunge)
8 - "Le Reptile Sous les Fleurs" (The Snake in the Flowers (US), The Serpent in the Flowers)
9 - "Le Cercueil Flottant" (The Floating Coffin)

Behind the scenes

Pearl White was hesitant to accept the title role, but signed up for $250/week and a large amount of  publicity.

William Randolph Hearst was involved in plot development.  He was also present at the premiere at Loew's Broadway Theatre, on March 23, 1914.  According to "The Truth About Pearl White" by Wallace E. Davis, the general release was approximately April 1, 1914.

E. A. McManus, head of the Hearst-Vitagraph service organization, was the person who proved how successful a serial could be.  He co-operated with the largest film equipment and production company in the world at that time, a France-based company named Pathé, to produce this serial, which was Pathé's first entry into the medium.  George B. Seitz tried to follow the cliffhanging pattern of The Adventures of Kathlyn but each chapter was mostly self-contained.

After retiring from law enforcement, William J. Flynn, former director of the Bureau of Investigation (forerunner of the FBI), became a scenario writer for the motion picture industry through his acquaintance with the actor King Baggot, who was considered the greatest film star in the country at that time in 1912. Producers Theodore and Leopold Wharton commissioned him to write story lines for their films, including Pauline. The Whartons also eventually adapted Flynn's experiences into a 20-part spy thriller titled The Eagle's Eye (1918), starring Baggot.

Surviving chapters of the French condensation of Pauline are noteworthy for their unintentionally funny re-translations of their title cards and dialogue captions in the English version, filled with misspellings, poor punctuation, terrible grammar, and odd expressions. The film was recut and adapted for home-movie use, and all of the printed captions were translated into French. Later, when the American home-movie industry beckoned, the original English titles had been scrapped, so the French technicians tried to translate the titles back into English.  These errors have also been blamed on Louis J. Gasnier, director and supervisor of the production. Gasnier, as explained by Crane Wilbur, made linguistic mistakes that confused the French-speaking crew.  The new title cards also renamed the villain's character: Raymond Owen as "Koerner," in reference to German "villainy" during World War I.

Newly-corrected intertitles which more closely approximate the content of the originals are used in the Serial Squadron restoration of the serial. The Squadron restoration also uses the original character names from the 20 episode US release and provides information about differences between the US and European versions of the serial.

Much of the film was shot in Fort Lee, New Jersey, where many early film studios in America's first motion picture industry were based at the beginning of the 20th century. Scenes were also filmed in Pittsburgh, Pennsylvania and Staten Island, New York. The term "cliffhanger" may have originated with the series, owing to a number of episodes filmed on or around the New Jersey Palisades—though it is also likely to refer to situations in stories of this type where the hero or heroine is hanging from a cliff, seemingly with no way out, until the next episode or last-minute resolution.

Pearl White performed most of her own stunts for the serial, but also was stunt doubled by a man. Filmed in the Adirondacks in New York, the stunt double rode a horse off a cliff into the lake below. Considerable risk was involved. In one incident, a balloon carrying White escaped and carried her across the Hudson River into a storm, before landing miles away. In another incident her back was permanently injured in a fall.

One of the more famous scenes in the serial which depicted a curved railroad bridge was supposedly the Ingham Creek trestle in New Hope, Pennsylvania on the Reading Company's New Hope Branch (now the New Hope and Ivyland Railroad line). The trestle still stands, just off Ferry Street along a private driveway. Some even nickname it Pauline's Trestle. The railroad is a tourist attraction and offers rides from New Hope to Lahaska, Pennsylvania, crossing over the original trestle. Subsequent comparisons of the existing photographs of the train used in the episode, however, do not match the appearance of the locomotives in use by the New Hope-Ivyland railroad at the time. Also, the short scene in the serial involving the train did not involve a trestle, but simply showed a crook escaping by parachute from a plane but then falling directly in the path of a locomotive. Other supposed locations for the railroad scenes include the Belvidere-Delaware Railroad in Lambertville and Raven Rock, New Jersey and the Long Island Rail Road in the Hamptons on Long Island. It is unlikely that any of these stories are anything but legends as, again, there were no major scenes involving action with trains in the serial.

Milton Berle (1908–2002) claimed The Perils of Pauline as his first film appearance, playing the character of a young boy, though this has never been independently verified and is unlikely as no child characters appear in the serial. The serial did mark one of the early credits for the cinematographer Arthur C. Miller, who was transferred to the project from the Pathé News department.

Pathé established an American factory and studio facility in Jersey City, New Jersey in 1910, and also established the Eclectic Film Company as a subsidiary distribution company for both its American and European products. Although the Jersey City plant produced moderately popular comedies, dramas, and newsreels largely directed at the US market, Pauline was the first American-made Pathé effort to achieve worldwide success under the Eclectic banner.

The final peril has Pauline sitting in a target boat as the Navy opens fire.  The idea was also used in To the Shores of Tripoli (1942).

Sequels and remakes

This successful serial was quickly followed by The Exploits of Elaine, also starring White. Many imitations and parodies followed, heralding the first golden age of the American film serial.

The title The Perils of Pauline was reused by Universal Studios for a 1933 sound serial with a different plot, by Paramount Pictures as the Betty Hutton vehicle The Perils of Pauline (1947), and by Universal again in 1967 as an updated comedy.

An abortive mixed-media musical was planned to be based on the film, called Who's That Girl?, meant to be premiered by The Boys from Syracuse producer Richard York on Broadway in 1970, with a book written by Lewis Banchi and Milburn Smith, and with the planned participation of the songwriting duo Ray Evans and Jay Livingston.

Legacy
The Perils of Pauline is the prime example of what scholar Ben Singer has called the "serial-queen melodrama".

There has been a recent reassessment of Singer's model in the light of broader film forms.

The film's style was later subject to nostalgic caricature in many forms (e.g. Dudley Do-Right), but the original heroine was neither as helpless as the caricatures, nor did the original series include the much-parodied "tied to railroad tracks" or "tied to buzzsaw" scenarios which appeared in later films in this vein. Even the title phrase "Perils of" was often adopted by later serials, for example, in Universal's Perils of the Secret Service, Perils of the Wild, and Perils of the Yukon. and Republic Pictures' Perils of Nyoka.

The 1969–70 cartoon series The Perils of Penelope Pitstop was patterned after this serial, and included the plot point of the villain trying to eliminate the heroine so he can keep her inheritance.

The Thunderbirds episode "The Perils of Penelope" was inspired by The Perils of Pauline.

See also
 List of film serials
 List of film serials by studio
 List of incomplete or partially lost films

References

External links

 

1914 films
1914 drama films
1910s action drama films
American silent serial films
American action drama films
American black-and-white films
Articles containing video clips
1910s English-language films
Films directed by Louis J. Gasnier
Films shot in New Jersey
Films shot in Fort Lee, New Jersey
Films shot in Pennsylvania
Pathé Exchange film serials
United States National Film Registry films
Melodrama films
1910s American films
Silent American drama films